is a Puyo Puyo dancing game created in 1999 for Arcade and Dreamcast. The game was released only in Japan. It is an adaptation of one of developer Compile's Disc Station games, Broadway Legend Ellena.

Objective 
Arle Nadja and her friends take some time off from Puyo fighting and challenge players to dance with them. The game features several dance stages, similar to games such as Space Channel 5 and PaRappa the Rapper. It also introduces a new ELLENA system used to render the game as well as a new exclusive character featuring the same name (Ellena Stevens, the protagonist of the original Broadway Legend Ellena featuring Park Jin Young). One or two players can dance to a variety of J-pop tunes by using the controller buttons to copy their opponent's moves. Based on how well a player copies the moves, Nuisance Puyos are sent to their opponent. The player loses if their health bar drops to 0, or if they have Nuisance Puyos on their side of the screen.

Reception 
Unlike other Puyo Puyo games, this one met with mainly negative reviews. GameSpot gave a 2.3 'terrible' rating stating that 
"you can pick up Puyo Puyo DA! and be completely fed up with it within an hour".

References

External links 
Puyo Puyo DA! at MobyGames

1999 video games
Arcade video games
Dance video games
Dreamcast games
Music video games
Puyo Puyo
Japan-exclusive video games
Video games developed in Japan
Multiplayer and single-player video games